Carey Carlisle Robinson (April 30, 1896 – June 16, 1962) was a college football player and coach and athletic director.

Auburn
Robinson was a prominent center for the Auburn Tigers football teams of Auburn University from 1914 to 1917.

Robinson was elected captain in 1917. He played some quarterback as well and was selected for some All-Southern teams.

Coaching career
Robinson was named athletic director of Birmingham–Southern College, serving as assistant on the football team under head coach and former Sewanee athlete Jenks Gillem.

References

External links
 

1896 births
1962 deaths
American football centers
American football quarterbacks
Auburn Tigers football players
Birmingham–Southern Panthers athletic directors
Birmingham–Southern Panthers football coaches
Mercer Bears football coaches
All-Southern college football players
Coaches of American football from Alabama
Players of American football from Alabama